The following is a list of majority leaders of the California State Assembly, the lower house of the California Legislature.

List

References

C
Members of the California State Assembly